Leonard Albert "Len" Black (born 19 March 1949) is a Roman Catholic priest in Scotland and part of the Personal Ordinariate of Our Lady of Walsingham. He was formerly an Anglican priest in the Scottish Episcopal Church.

Black was educated at the Bernard Gilpin Society, Sands House in Durham and the Edinburgh Theological College. He was ordained in 1973. He was curate at St Margaret of Scotland, Aberdeen and then chaplain of St Paul's Cathedral, Dundee. From 1977 to 1980 he was priest in charge of St Ninian's, Aberdeen, and then became rector of St Michael & All Angels, Inverness. and St John the Evangelist, Inverness in 1980.

In 1987 Black resigned as rector of St John the Evangelist, Inverness, to take up a part-the appointment as Religious and Community Programmes Producer at Moray Firth Radio  in Inverness. He also served as Area Chaplain for Scotland of the Actors Church Union from 1987 to 2003 and Synod Clerk of the Moray, Ross and Caithness from 1992 to 2003.

He was Regional Dean for Scotland of Forward in Faith from 2001 to 2011 and was Dean of the Moray, Ross and Caithness from 2003 to 2009.

He resigned as rector of St Michael and All Angels, Inverness, in March 2011 and, accompanied by a group of lay people, became part of the Personal Ordinariate of Our Lady of Walsingham. They were received into the Catholic Church on Easter Eve 2011. Black was ordained priest by Bishop Philip Tartaglia (Archbishop of Glasgow 2012 to 2021) in July 2011 and set up an ordinariate group in Scotland.

Black is also an author, among other books he has written Sir Ninian Comper - Liturgical Architect (1999), The Church that Moved Across the Water (2003) and Churches of the Diocese of Moray, Ross and Caithness (2004). In 2011 he became part of the editorial team of The Portal magazine, the official monthly magazine of the Personal Ordinariate of Our Lady of Walsingham.

References

1949 births
Scottish Anglo-Catholics
Deans of Moray, Ross and Caithness
Living people
Anglo-Catholic clergy
Anglican priest converts to Roman Catholicism
People of the personal ordinariates
21st-century Scottish Roman Catholic priests
20th-century Scottish Episcopalian priests